Job Stewart (20 January 1934 – 23 October 1991) was a British stage and screen actor.

Born in Cape Town, South Africa, Stewart took to the stage in the 1950s, appearing in Shakespeare and in West End drama, then gained screen roles in film and on television.

Stewart was a close friend of Judi Dench and worked with her on Love in a Cold Climate (1980).

His last screen work was in Hong Kong in the mid 1980s and he died there in 1991, aged 57.

On stage
King Richard II (Winter Garden Theatre, Broadway, 23 October 1956 - 12 January 1957) as Page
Romeo and Juliet (Winter Garden Theatre, Broadway, 23 October 1956 - 12 January 1957) as Peter
Macbeth (Winter Garden Theatre, Broadway, 23 October 1956 - 12 January 1957) as Witch
Troilus and Cressida (Winter Garden Theatre, Broadway, 23 October 1956 - 12 January 1957) as Nestor
Hamlet (Broadway Theatre, 53rd Street, 16 December 1958 — 10 January 1959) as Osric
King Henry V (Broadway Theatre, 25 December 1958 — 10 January 1959) as Nym
Romeo and Juliet (City Center Theater, New York, 13 February 1962 - 18 March 1962) as Benvolio
Saint Joan  (City Center Theater, New York, 20 February 1962 - 18 March 1962) as Dauphin
The Astrakhan Coat (Helen Hayes Theatre, 12 January 1967 - 28 January 1967) as Alain

Film and television work
Armchair Theatre: Man in a Moon (1957)
Tragedy in a Temporary Town (1958) as John Phillips
Wolf Pack (1958) as Lieutenant Anstey
Power and Glory (1963)
Jezebel ex UK (TV series) (1963) as Dr Stannard
Crane: Two Rings for Danger (1964) as Alphonse
The Hidden Truth (TV series): The Guinea Pig (1964) as John Pershore
The Old Wives' Tale (TV series) (1964) as Monsieur Chirac
The Lift (1965) as Joe
Play of the Month (BBC TV series): The Moon and Sixpence (1967) as Chess player
Theatre 625: Lieutenant Tenant (1967) as Captain
Kittens Are Brave (1967) as Miles Jarvis
The Year of the Sex Olympics (1968) as Custard Pie Expert
The Last Shot You Hear (1969) as Policeman
The First Churchills (1969) as Lord Shrewsbury
Galileo (1975) as Monk-Scholar
Play for Today:  A Child of Hope (1975) as Ernest Wentzel
BBC2 Playhouse: An Affinity with Dr. Still (1979) as Weekes
Love in a Cold Climate (1980) as Boy Dougdale
The Professionals: Kickback (1980) as Russell
Holding the Fort: Under a Cloud (1981) as Toby Millichap
A Fine Romance: Furniture (1982) as Salesman
Love in a Fallen City (1984)
Kung Hei Fat Choy (1985)

Notes

External links

1934 births
1991 deaths
British actors